Torolf Smedvig (1917-1977) was a Norwegian businessman and the head of Smedvig ASA.

Early life
He was the eldest son of Peder Smedvig, the founder of Smedvig ASA.

Career
After his father Peder Smedvig died in 1959, his son Torolf Smedvig took over the running of the company and the canned food business became a separate company run by another branch of the family.

Personal life
In 1942, he married Nora Kluge (1921-1999), the daughter of supreme court judge Kristofer Nordahl Kluge (1892–1972).

His son Peter Smedvig took over the running of the company. His granddaughter is Anna Margaret Smedvig.

References

1917 births
1977 deaths
Norwegian businesspeople in shipping
Smedvig family